Lawra Municipal District is one of the eleven districts in Upper West Region, Ghana. Originally it was formerly part of the then-larger Lawra District in 1988; until the northern part of the district was later split off to create Nandom District on 28 June 2012; thus the remaining part has been remain as Lawra District, which it was later elevated to municipal district assembly status on 15 March 2018 to become Lawra Municipal District. The municipality is located in the northwest part of Upper West Region and has Lawra as its capital town.

Geography and climate

Geography
Lawra District lies in the North Western corner of the Upper West Region between Longitudes 2°25"W and 2°45"W and Latitudes 10°20"N and 11°00"N.

It is bounded to the East and South by the Jirapa/Lambussie District and Lambussie-Karni District. The total area of the District as at 2014 (GSS, 2012) is estimated to be 483.6 square kilometres. This constitutes about 2.6% of the Region's total area, which is estimated at 18,476 square kilometres. This follows the splitting of Nandom in 2012 as its own district.

Sources
 
 GhanaDistricts.com

References

Districts of Upper West Region